Gheorghe Văleanu (February 12, 1864 – January 12, 1948) was a Romanian major general and military commander. During the First World War he commanded VI., IV. and II. corps and was notable in the Battle of Mărăști and the Third Battle of Oituz.

Military career
Gheorghe Văleanu was born on February 12, 1864, in Slatina. He was the son of Costică and Maria Văleanu born Niculescu. After completing high school in Iași, he began his military training in 1882 by attending the Military School for Infantry and Cavalry in Bucharest, which he completed in 1884, graduating with the rank of second lieutenant. From 1884 he attended the École Polytechnique in Paris, and after that from 1888 to 1889 the School of Artillery and Engineering in Fontainebleau. He reached the rank of lieutenant in 1887 then promoted to the rank of captain in 1890, and promoted to the rank of major in 1895.

From 1895 to 1899 Văleanu taught at the National School of Bridges and Roads. He attended the Higher War School in Bucharest and graduated from it in 1899. In 1901 he was promoted to the rank of lieutenant colonel, and he taught at the Higher War School from 1902 to 1906. He reached the rank of colonel in 1907, and was promoted to the rank of brigadier general in 1912, after which in 1914 he became commander of the 2nd Division. In 1916 he was appointed commander of the fortified city of Bucharest.

World War I
After Romania entered the war on the side of the Entente, Văleanu was appointed commander of the VI. corps. The corps, which consisted of the 16th and 18th Divisions, was part of the 3rd Army under the command of Mihail Aslan, and held positions south of Bucharest. Văleanu commanded the Sixth Corps until September 27, 1916, when the corps was disbanded.

On June 11, 1917, Văleanu was appointed commander of the IV. corps of the 2nd Army. While commanding the IV. corps, he participated in the Battle of Mărăști, after which he was promoted to the rank of divisional general. He commanded the Fourth Corps until August 1, 1917, when he took command of the II. corps replacing the command with Artur Văitoianu who in turn became commander of the IV. corps. After taking command of II. Corps, Văleanu, commanding them, took part in the Third Battle of Oituz. He commanded the Second Corps until February 5, 1918, after which he resigned from the Army.

Political career
In April 1918 he joined General Alexandru Averescu's People's Party. In 1920 he was elected to the Chamber of Deputies and later to the Senate. Văleanu served as Minister of Public Works (March 13 to June 13, 1920) and Minister of Communications (June 13, 1920, to December 16, 1921) in the Second Averescu cabinet, and again as Minister of Communications in the Third Averescu cabinet (March 30, 1926, to June 4, 1927). He died on January 12, 1948, in Bucharest.

References

Bibliography
Falkenhayn, Erich von, The 9th Army Campaign against Romanians and Russians, Atelierele Grafice Socec & Co SA, Bucharest, 1937
Kirițescu, Constantin, History of the war for the unification of Romania, Scientific and Encyclopedic Publishing House, Bucharest, 1989
Ioanițiu, Alexandru, Războiul României: 1916–1918, vol 1, Tipografia Geniului, București, 1929
Romania in the World War 1916–1919, Documents, Annexes , Volume 1, Official Gazette and State Printing, Bucharest, 1934
The General Headquarters of the Romanian Army. Documents 1916–1920, Machiavelli Publishing House, Bucharest, 1996
Military history of the Romanian people, vol. V, Military Publishing House, Bucharest, 1989
Romania in the years of the First World War, Military Publishing House, Bucharest, 1987
Romania in the First World War, Military Publishing House, 1979

1864 births
1948 deaths
People from Slatina, Romania
École Polytechnique alumni
Carol I National Defence University alumni
Romanian military personnel of the Second Balkan War
Romanian Army World War I generals
Romanian Land Forces generals
People's Party (interwar Romania) politicians
Members of the Chamber of Deputies (Romania)
Members of the Senate of Romania
Romanian Ministers of Public Works
Romanian Ministers of Communications
Academic staff of the Politehnica University of Bucharest
Academic staff of Carol I National Defence University